The Peace Alliance is a nonprofit organization based in the United States that works on domestic and international peace building. The organization organizes Peace Alliance Action Teams within state congressional districts and also a Student Peace Alliance youth group.

Mission
The mission of the Peace Alliance is to establish a culture of peace through civic engagement. Examples of their work include legislative efforts such as bills to establish a Department of Peace, and to address youth violence through the Youth PROMISE Act (S. 1318, H.R. 1307), as well as direct efforts within local communities to work on peaceful resolution of problems such as bullying in the schools, conflict resolution, and gang violence. Their overarching driving initiative is Be the Movement! Take a Step for Peace: In Your Life, In Our Communities, Among Nations.  This initiative focuses on five key peacebuilding cornerstones: Empowering Community Peacebuilding; Teaching Peace in Schools; Humanizing Justice Systems; Cultivating Personal Peace; and Fostering International Peace.

Recent events and activities
The Peace Alliance has launched a "Faces of Peace" campaign to highlight grassroots efforts at peacebuilding in local communities. Recent legislative efforts include: The Safe Schools Improvement Act (S.506 and H.R. 1648) to address bullying in schools; advocacy for international peacebuilding efforts within U.S. State Department and foreign operations funding appropriations; and legislation to establish a Department of Peace (H.R. 808).

See also
 List of anti-war organizations

References

External links
 Official website

Peace organizations based in the United States
Organizations established in 2004
Marianne Williamson